Sara Minami (Minami Sara, June 11, 2002) is a Japanese actress and model under LesPros Entertainment.

She won the 18th Nicola Model Audition Grand Prix. She is a former exclusive model for the fashion magazine nicola.

Career 
In 2014, she won the 18th Nicola Model Audition Grand Prix. In October of the same year, she became an exclusive model for the fashion magazine nicola.

In 2017, she made her debut as an actress in the movie Dear Etranger. She was nominated for the 60th Blue Ribbon Awards for Newcomers for her appearance in the film, but missed her award. In the same year, she starred in the music video for Rebecca's new song, Koini Ochitara.

In 2018, she made her movie debut starring in the movie Shino Can't Say Her Name. She played the role of a high school girl with stuttering, and showed impressing acting in the scene where she cried lamenting with a runny nose. Her performance in the film was rated highly, and along with double-starring Aju Makita, the two were awarded the 43rd Hochi Film Award for Best Newcomer and the 33rd Takasaki Film Festival Best New Actress Award. Additionally, Minami was awarded the 61st Blue Ribbon Award and 28th Japanese Movie Critics Award for New Actress. In September, she was appointed as the new image character for Pocky and made her first appearance in the commercials.

In 2019, she made her first appearance in a TV drama in Cocoa broadcast by Fuji TV on January 4, 2019. In March of the same year, she ended her contract as an exclusive model for nicola. She challenged jidaigeki historical drama for the first time in Iwane: Sword of Serenity released in May of the same year.

In 2021, she starred in the TV drama series Dragon Zakura broadcast on TBS.

She will act in the 2022 NHK taiga drama The 13 Lords of the Shogun as Ohime, the daughter of Minamoto no Yoritomo and Hōjō Masako.

Filmography

Film

Television

Japanese dub

Awards

References

External links
 

Japanese film actresses
Japanese models
2002 births
People from Tokyo
Living people